Bhobishyoter Bhoot is a 2019 Bengali satirical comedy film directed by Anik Dutta. The film was released on 15 February 2019. Despite its similar topics, Dutta states that it is not a sequel to his film, Bhooter Bhabishyat (2012). All single and multiple screen theaters were stopped from showing the film immediately after release sighting "orders from upper management". Various leading newspapers quoted unnamed sources, as well Dutta, as saying that the West Bengal police had issued these instructions to the theatres.

Plot
Calcuttan Ghosts were rendered homeless as all the old haunted buildings were converted into multistoried buildings and malls. Various types of ghosts like politician, extortionist, cabaret dancer, Jatra actor are there. They constantly face certain social and political issues confronting the present times and also marginalized by their shrinking habitat in the real world, they conjecture whether they should find a place in the virtual world or cyberspace for their survival. Some of them take shelter in a disused refugee camp. They plan to make themselves fit for the new world and fight against injustices. And finally find a very novel solution to their existential crisis.

Cast
 Paran Banerjee as Mrityunjoy Biswas, Natasurjo
 Chandrayee Ghosh as Miss Rupali
 Barun Chanda as Harisadhan Ray aka Harry, the ghost of a manager of old British Mercantile Firm
 Sabyasachi Chakraborty in a guest appearance
 Kaushik Sen as Ambubachi Dutta, a leader of the ruling political party
 Shataf Figar as Alex
 Chandan Sen as film producer.
 Shantilal Mukherjee as the editor of a popular newspaper
 Kanchan Mullick as Bhuto, a side role actor
 Debolina Dutta as Mokkhoda aka Motibai, an widow daner ghost who later become feminist
 Swastika Mukherjee in a guest appearance as ghost of Batabibala
 Moon Moon Sen in a guest appearance as Madam Jessica aka Miss J, an Anglo-Indian dance trainer
 Kharaj Mukherjee in a guest appearance as Bishtu Mondal
 Rachel White as lead dancer in opening credit scenes
 Siddhartha Chatterjee as an organizer of Ghost-walk
 Badshah Maitra as Director Khonik
 Arunava Dutta as Biru, Production Manager
 Reshmi Sen as Sangeeta Sur, a ghost of Rabindra Sangeet artist
 Deboprasad Halder as assistant director
 Sumanta Mukherjee as Samyabrata Sarkar, the ghost of a left-wing party worker.
 Amit Saha as Bholanath Khara, an anti-social ghost who once used to be an artist.
 Sourav Chakraborty as Satyajit, a freelance investigating journalist
 Sumit Samaddar in a guest appearance
 Sibaji Bandopadhay as ghost-expert Nidhiram Banerjee aka Nidhu-babu
 Pradip Mitra as an organizer of Ghost-walk
 Sanjay Biswas in a guest appearance

Controversy 
Right after the release, the film was removed from different theatres in Kolkata. The de facto ban was accordingly criticised as "fascist" (by noted actor Soumitra Chatterjee and actor-director Aparna Sen), "condemnable" (by director Srijit Mukherji), "extremely undemocratic" (by economist and London School of Economics Professor Maitreesh Ghatak), and as an "infringement on one’s fundamental right to view a film" (by an editorial in The Statesman (India)). Other scholars and commentators termed the de facto ban "clearly unconstitutional" and in violation of Indian Supreme Court precedents, and an example of "liberal hypocrisy" (considering the ostensibly left-liberal credentials of the Chief Minister of West Bengal, Mamata Banerjee). When asked about the incident, Banerjee told the press: "I will not answer. Don’t ask me this question." Various processions and marches have been carried out to protest against the ban. A writ petition against the ban has been filed before the Calcutta High Court by film enthusiasts. The Supreme Court ordered the West Bengal government to pay compensation of Rs 20 lakh to Kalyanmoy Billy Chatterjee, producer of the film Bhobishyoter Bhoot, for imposing a “virtual ban” on the screening of the movie. The court also imposed a fine of Rs 1 lakh on the Mamata Banerjee-led government, "Free speech cannot be gagged for fear of the mob", the court said. It expressed concern over "growing intolerance" in society against artistic freedom.

Present 
Bhobishyoter Bhoot can now be seen on the MyCinemaHall app.

References

External links
 

2019 films
2019 comedy films
Indian comedy films
Bengali-language Indian films
2010s Bengali-language films
Films directed by Anik Dutta
2010s satirical films
Indian satirical films